There are very few bridges with buildings in the world.  This list attempts to identify all the existing ones and notable former ones featuring significant closed commercial, residential, governmental, or religious worship structures.  There exist numerous proposals for inhabited bridges, including 73 designs submitted in the Royal Institute of British Architects' competition at the 800th anniversary of London Bridge, but the table here presents only bridges actually built.

Various blog-like and magazine-type sources attempt to itemize them, but find only a few.

Many bridges include pavilions or other shelters serving pedestrians crossing the bridge, without providing commercial, residential, governmental, or religious worship space; these are not included.

Some "covered bridges" such as Pont de Rohan, in Landerneau, and the Pont des Marchands, in Narbonne, both in France, had residential buildings; these two were among at least 45 inhabited bridges that once existed in Europe, and when the rest are known all should be added here.  Other covered bridges in Germany, the United States, and elsewhere might be seen as "buildings" in that their roof protects an enclosed area, but the purpose of the covering is to preserve the structure and the enclosed space is primarily for traffic to pass through.  The term "covered bridges" is also used for structures in China such as Chengyang Bridge (1912) and Xijin Bridge (rebuilt 1718) which have large enclosed spaces, but for these it appears that space is not provided for commercial or residential use.  These are not included here; please see List of covered bridges.

The term "covered bridge" is sometimes used broadly to describe any "bridge-like structure" that is covered by a roof. However, bridge-like structures such as Heilig-Geist-Spital, a hospital built out over two arched spans into the Pegnitz river in Nuremberg, but which did not ever provide a complete crossing to the other side, are not included. These also are not intended to be included.

Bridges having buildings (with significant commercial, residential, governmental, or religious worship space) include:

Australia

Bulgaria

Canada

China

Czech Republic

England

France

"Between 12th and 16th century many bridges were built with houses on them. They were solution for limited accommodation in walled cities and only France had as many as 35."

Ponts Couverts, Strasbourg, a covered bridge in Strasbourg, has four massive towers that are buildings, but these are on islands not the bridge itself. (See :File:Panorama de Strasbourg - 2014-02-02- P1760351 - P1760357.jpg)

Germany

Italy

Spain

Switzerland

Turkey

Vietnam

Wales

See also 
Bridge castle
List of covered bridges

References

With Buildings